Statue of Theodore Roosevelt may refer to:

 Equestrian Statue of Theodore Roosevelt (New York City), U.S.
 Theodore Roosevelt, Rough Rider, Portland, Oregon, U.S.